Lermontov is a town in Stavropol Krai, Russia, located on the mountainside of Beshtau. Population:    16,500 (1973).

History
It was named after Russian poet Mikhail Lermontov. It was granted town status in 1956.

Uranium mining boosted its growth. It was a closed town during the Soviet era. Uranium is no longer mined.

Administrative and municipal status
Within the framework of administrative divisions, it is, together with one rural locality (the selo of Ostrogorka), incorporated as the town of krai significance of Lermontov—an administrative unit with the status equal to that of the districts. By 2022 it is planned to unite Lermontov and the village Bervinovka. As a municipal division, the town of krai significance of Lermontov is incorporated as Lermontov Urban Okrug.

References

Notes

Sources

Cities and towns in Stavropol Krai
Mikhail Lermontov